Clavus vibicinus is a species of sea snail, a marine gastropod mollusk in the family Drilliidae.

Description

Distribution
This species occurs in the demersal zone of the tropical Pacific Ocean.

References

 Kuroda, T. and T. Habe 1952 Checklist and bibliography of the recent marine Mollusca of Japan. Leo. W. Stach, Publisher, Tokyo. 210 pp.
 Tucker, J.K. 2004 Catalog of recent and fossil turrids (Mollusca: Gastropoda). Zootaxa 682:1–1295

External links

vibicinus
Gastropods described in 1779